Rigak may refer to:
 Rigak, Chaharmahal and Bakhtiari
 Rigak, Hormozgan
 Rigak, Kerman